The General Osteopathic Council (GOsC) is the regulator of the practice of osteopathy in the United Kingdom.

The GOsC was established in 1997 following the Osteopaths Act 1993 to 'provide for the regulation of the profession of osteopathy' with the primary aim of protecting the public. It produced the first Statutory Register of Osteopaths in 2000. https://www.osteopathy.org.uk/home/

The aims of the GOsC are: 
To protect patients
To develop the osteopathic profession
To promote an understanding of osteopathic care

The work of the GOsC includes:
Registers qualified professionals
Sets standards of osteopathic practice and conduct
Assures the quality of osteopathic education
Ensures Continuing Professional Development
Helps patients with complaints about an osteopath

Oversight of health and social care regulators 

The Professional Standards Authority for Health and Social Care (PSA), is an independent body accountable to the UK Parliament, which promotes the health and wellbeing of the public and oversees the nine UK healthcare regulators, including GOsC.

References

External links
General Osteopathic Council website

Health in the London Borough of Southwark
Medical and health regulators
Medical regulation in the United Kingdom
Organisations based in the London Borough of Southwark
Organizations established in 1997
Osteopathy in the United Kingdom
Regulators of the United Kingdom
1997 establishments in the United Kingdom